Hagibis (meaning rapidity or speed in Tagalog) is one of the first comic book superheroes in the history of komiks in the Philippines. Hagibis was created in 1947 by Francisco V. Coching, a Filipino comic book artist and illustrator who is considered as the "father" or "grandfather" of Filipino comics. Tarzanesque in appearance, the form of Hagibis had also been based on another early Filipino comic book hero, Kulafu, who was created by Francisco Reyes. Hagibis featured in one of the longest-running serials in the history of Filipino comic books, which ran for fifteen years in Liwayway magazine. Hagibis was later featured in a film with Fernando Poe, Sr. as Hagibis.

See also
 Captain Barbell
 Darna
 Lagim
 Ipo-ipo
 Siopawman
 Varga
 Voltar

References

Philippine comics titles
1947 comics debuts
Comics characters introduced in 1947
Jungle men
Jungle (genre) comics
Fictional Filipino people
Male characters in comics
Philippine comics adapted into films
Filipino comics characters